This is a complete list of ice hockey players who played for the Atlanta Flames in the National Hockey League (NHL). It includes players that have played at least one regular season or playoff game for the Atlanta Flames from their founding in 1972 until their relocation to Calgary in 1980.  A total of 93 players wore the "Flaming A" — six goaltenders and 88 skaters.  Three players captured individual awards during their time in Atlanta:  Eric Vail (1975) and Willi Plett (1977) won the Calder Memorial Trophy as rookie of the year, while Bob MacMillan won the Lady Byng Trophy as the most gentlemanly player in the NHL in 1979.

The Atlanta Flames all-time leading scorer was Tom Lysiak, who recorded 431 points in six seasons in Atlanta.  Vail led the team in goals with 174.  Goaltender Dan Bouchard was the team's top goaltender.  A Flame for all eight seasons the team called Atlanta home, Bouchard won 164 games, while posting a team best 3.00 career goals against average in Atlanta.


Key

Skaters

Goaltenders

References
Atlanta Flames all-time roster on the Internet Hockey Database
Atlanta Flames all-time roster at legendsofhockey.net
The Goaltender Home Page
Goaltenders: 2007–08 Calgary Flames Media Guide, pg. 132
Skaters: 2007–08 Calgary Flames Media Guide, pgs. 233–241

+
Atlanta Flames
players